Hearts and Armour is a 1983 Italian adventure film directed by Giacomo Battiato. It is loosely based on the stories of the Paladins especially the epic poem Orlando Furioso by Ludovico Ariosto.

The film was generally panned by critics, but appreciated on its visual side. The Sydney Morning Herald wrote "The settings are sensational, the costumes are magnificent. The story, on the other hand, is almost non-existent". Hearts and Armour won the David di Donatello for Best Costumes.  A much longer version of the film was broadcast as a mini-series on Italian television.

Cast
 Zeudi Araya as Marfisa
 Barbara De Rossi as Bradamante
 Rick Edwards as Rolando
 Ronn Moss as Ruggiero
 Maurizio Nichetti as Atlante
 Tanya Roberts as Isabella
 Giovanni Visentin as Gano
 Tony Vogel as Ferraù
 Leigh McCloskey as Rinaldo
 Lina Sastri as Maga
 Lucien Bruchon as Aquilante
 Alfredo Bini as King Cristiano
 Pier Luigi Conti (Al Cliver) as Selvaggio

References

External links

1983 films
1980s English-language films
1980s fantasy adventure films
1980s Italian-language films
1983 multilingual films
English-language Italian films
Italian fantasy adventure films
Italian multilingual films
Films based on the Matter of France
Films directed by Giacomo Battiato
Films set in the 8th century
Sword and sorcery films
Warner Bros. films
1980s Italian films